Kenai Kiprotich Kenei (born 1978) is a male long-distance runner from Kenya. He set his personal best (2:07:42) in the men's marathon on April 29, 2007, finishing third in the Hamburg Marathon.

Achievements

External links

Marathon Info Profile

1978 births
Living people
Kenyan male long-distance runners